The U.S. Post Office in Catskill, New York was built as part of a public works program during the Great Depression. It was added to the National Register of Historic Places in 1986.

It's one of 148 post offices in New York State covered in one thematic resources study performed by the New York State Office of Parks, Recreation, and Historic Services.

References

Catskill
Government buildings completed in 1935
Buildings and structures in Greene County, New York
National Register of Historic Places in Greene County, New York